Lamar Joseph Odom (born November 6, 1979) is an American former professional basketball player. As a member of the Los Angeles Lakers in the National Basketball Association (NBA), he won championships in 2009 and 2010 and was named the NBA Sixth Man of the Year in 2011.

In high school, Odom received national player of the year honors from Parade in 1997. He played college basketball for the University of Rhode Island, earning all-conference honors during his only season in the Atlantic 10 Conference before turning professional. The Los Angeles Clippers selected Odom with the fourth overall pick in the first round of the 1999 NBA draft. He was named to the NBA All-Rookie Team in the following year; it was during his four seasons with the Clippers, however, that he was twice suspended for violating the league's anti-drug policy. As a restricted free agent, he then signed with the Miami Heat, where he played the 2003–04 season before being traded to the Lakers. Odom spent seven seasons with the Lakers, who traded him to the Dallas Mavericks in 2011. After the move, his career declined. He was traded back to the Clippers in 2012 and played briefly in Spain in 2014.

Odom played on the United States national team, winning a bronze medal in the Olympics in 2004 and a gold medal in the FIBA World Championship (later known as the World Cup) in 2010.

Odom was married to Khloé Kardashian from 2009 to 2016. During their marriage, Odom made several appearances on the reality television show Keeping Up with the Kardashians. He and Kardashian also had their own reality series, Khloé & Lamar. In October 2015, Odom was hospitalized in a comatose state after being discovered unconscious in a Nevada brothel. He later sought treatment for drug and alcohol addiction.

Early life
Odom was born in South Jamaica, Queens, New York City, to Joe Odom and Cathy Mercer. His father was a heroin addict. His mother died of colon cancer when he was only 12 years old. On her deathbed, she reportedly told him: "Be nice to everybody." Odom was afterwards raised by his maternal grandmother, Mildred Mercer.

In his first three years of high school, Odom played for Christ the King Regional High School in Middle Village, Queens. He left the school at the start of his senior year due to poor grades, transferring first to Redemption Christian Academy in Troy, New York, and then to the now-defunct St. Thomas Aquinas High School in New Britain, Connecticut, where he was coached by Jerry DeGregorio. As a senior, Odom was recognized nationally as the Parade Player of the Year in 1997. Among other distinctions, he earned USA Today All-USA First Team honors and was named to the Parade All-American First Team for the second consecutive year. While still in high school, Odom played on the same AAU team as future NBA teammates Elton Brand and Ron Artest (later known as Metta World Peace); he also played at the Adidas ABCD Camp with future Lakers teammate Kobe Bryant. Adidas executive Sonny Vaccaro commented at the time that Odom possessed a "$2 million smile".

College career
Though he considered entering the NBA directly from high school and consulted Kobe Bryant as a player who had made that jump, Odom ultimately decided that he was not ready and committed to the University of Nevada at Las Vegas instead. However, a Sports Illustrated story questioning the validity of his ACT score and an arrest for soliciting prostitution provided the school cause enough to revoke his scholarship, and for this reason, he never played for the Runnin' Rebels. To the university's further embarrassment, an investigation by the NCAA would later reveal that Odom had received $5,600 in illicit payments from one of its boosters, resulting in the firing of Coach Bill Bayno and UNLV being placed on probation for four years.

Odom transferred to the University of Rhode Island, with the cost of his room and board being covered by funds his father received from the G.I. Bill. Since he was admitted as a non-matriculating student, Odom was forced to sit out the 1997–98 season. After two semesters and a summer session, however, Odom earned his eligibility to play intramural basketball. His career at Rhode Island had been in some jeopardy during his first semester after he once vanished before finals; that is until coach Jim Harrick prevailed upon three of his four instructors to let him make up his extant work. The coach also had Odom work alongside DeGregorio, who had become a Rams assistant and ended up being the player's closest friend in college. Odom also drew inspiration from the example of his maternal grandmother, a nurse who had raised five children and returned to school to earn her degree in 1980 at the age of 56.

Odom played one season (1998–99) for Rhode Island, during which he averaged 17.6 points per game and led the Rams to the conference championship. He earned First Team All-Conference honors and was named the Atlantic 10 Rookie of the Year. He was named the most valuable player of the Atlantic 10 tournament after his three-point shot at the buzzer against Temple gave the Rams their first A-10 title.

Professional career

Los Angeles Clippers (1999–2003)

Odom declared his eligibility for the 1999 NBA draft after his freshman year at Rhode Island. He then tried to return to college, thinking he was not ready for the NBA; but having already signed with an agent, he was no longer eligible to withdraw from the draft. Odom was selected by the Los Angeles Clippers with the fourth overall pick. In his first season with the Clippers, Odom averaged 16.6 points, 7.8 rebounds, and 4.2 assists per game. He put up 30 points and tore down 12 rebounds in his NBA debut. He was named to the 2000 NBA All-Rookie First Team.

In the 2000–01 season, Odom increased his scoring average to 17.2 points a game as he started in 74 games. The Clippers again failed to make the playoffs, however, as the young team could not improve their positioning in the Western Conference. In March 2001, Odom was suspended for five games for violating the terms of the NBA's anti-drug policy. In the following season, he was suspended in November for yet another infraction of the anti-drug policy, his second offense in eight months. He admitted to using marijuana after the suspension. Odom only played 29 games during the season, and his production slipped.

He would only play in 49 games during the 2002–03 season, and would become a restricted free agent the following summer. The Miami Heat offered a deal that the Clippers declined to match after already matching another offer the Heat made to Elton Brand.

Miami Heat (2003–2004)
The Heat had won only 25 games the previous season but had drafted young talent such as Dwyane Wade and Caron Butler. Odom was brought on to play as the team's starting power forward. Along with a budding Wade and the veteran Eddie Jones, Odom shared the scoring load, scoring 17.1 points to go with a career-high 9.7 rebounds per game. Despite an inauspicious start to the season where they lost seven consecutive games, the Heat ended up playing much better and even competing for a seed in the playoffs. On March 6, Odom posted a triple-double, scoring 30 points with 19 rebounds and 11 assists in a home win over the Sacramento Kings. The Heat would go on to clinch the fourth seed in the playoffs and face off against the New Orleans Hornets in the first round. Each team won at home, but the Heat would win a seventh deciding game to advance to the second round and face a top-seeded Indiana Pacers team. The Pacers won the first two games in Indiana, but the Heat responded with two consecutive home wins, including a game 4 victory that was led by Odom's 22 points. The Pacers' breadth of experience proved too much for the younger Heat, however, as they claimed games 5 and 6 to win the series. All in all, Odom had a solid season compared to his previous one with the Clippers.

After the season, Odom was traded in a package with Caron Butler and Brian Grant to the Los Angeles Lakers for All-Star Shaquille O'Neal.

Los Angeles Lakers (2004–2011)

In his first year with the Los Angeles Lakers, Odom incurred a left shoulder injury that forced him to miss the end of the 2004–05 season. Despite Odom averaging 15.2 points and a career-high 10.2 rebounds, the Lakers finished out of the playoffs for only the 5th time in franchise history. Following the 2004–05 season, they re-hired former coach Phil Jackson.

In the first half of the 2005–06 season, Odom showed signs of inconsistency. However, as Los Angeles progressed towards the end of the season, his performance steadily improved. Along the way, he posted consecutive triple-doubles for the first time as a Laker in games against the Golden State Warriors and the Portland Trail Blazers. The Lakers were eliminated in 7 games in their first round playoffs matchup against the Phoenix Suns, having blown a 3–1 series lead. Odom averaged 14.8 points and 9.2 rebounds during the season and increased his scoring (19.1) and rebounds (11) in seven playoff contests.

Battling injuries, Odom was limited to 56 games in 2006–07, but finished with an average of 15.9 points and 9.8 rebounds per game. In a rematch of the previous year's series, the Lakers were again defeated by the Suns in the first round of the 2007 NBA Playoffs.

After young center Andrew Bynum had gone down with a knee injury and Pau Gasol was acquired amid the 2007–08 season, Odom stepped up his production, as he posted averages of 15.3 points, 12 rebounds, and 4 assists across 36 games. He would finish that season averaging 14.2 points, 10.6 rebounds, and 3.5 assists per contest. In the 2008 NBA Finals, however, his numbers would decline to 13.5 points, 9 rebounds, and 3 assists per game, with the Lakers falling to the Boston Celtics.

In 2008–09, Odom arrived to training camp out of shape. Jackson later disclosed his plan to move Odom to the bench as their sixth man, backing up the Lakers' frontcourt consisting of Gasol, Bynum, and Trevor Ariza. A free agent after the season, Odom initially balked at the prospect of playing as a reserve for the first time in his career. But he came around to the assignment soon enough, having resolved to sacrifice his own numbers to make his teammates happy and in hopes of securing his first NBA championship. In January, after Bynum got injured in a game against the Memphis Grizzlies, Odom returned to the starting lineup. Over the month of February, he averaged 16.5 points and 13.4 rebounds while playing 36 minutes a night. This February run included a standout performance at the Quicken Loans Arena in Cleveland. The 15 points Odom scored in the third quarter helped the Lakers turn a 12-point deficit to a 10-point victory, ending Cleveland's 23-game home winning streak in the process. Odom finished the game with 28 points, 17 rebounds, and 2 assists.

When Bynum returned to the hardwood for a home game against the Denver Nuggets, on the 9th of April, Odom adjusted back into his sixth-man role. Odom finished the season with 11.3 points, 8.2 rebounds, 2.6 assists, 1.0 steals, and 1.3 blocks with 29.7 minutes per contest. He won his first NBA championship when the Lakers defeated the Orlando Magic in the 2009 NBA Finals.

Over the 2009 offseason, Odom was heavily courted by his former franchise, the Miami Heat. Despite pleas from Heat guard Dwyane Wade and Heat executive Pat Riley, Kobe Bryant was optimistic that Odom would return to Los Angeles, reasoning that he would prefer to team up with newly acquired asset and fellow New Yorker Ron Artest. On July 31, 2009, after a month of tedious negotiations, the Lakers announced that they had made a four-year, $33 million deal with Odom. The investment paid off as Odom would play a crucial role for the Lakers on their way to another NBA Championship, with the team winning over the Boston Celtics in the 2010 NBA Finals.

Odom continued his strong play for the Lakers with another solid season in 2010–11, as he posted career-highs in both three-point shooting percentage (.382) and overall field goal percentage (.530). He started 35 games in Bynum's absence during the season and averaged 16.3 points and 10.2 rebounds in those games. In 47 games off the bench, Odom averaged 13.5 points, 7.5 rebounds in 28.4 minutes. Meeting the requirement to come in as a reserve more games than he started, Odom was awarded the NBA Sixth Man of the Year Award, becoming the first player in Lakers history to do so. Bryant called it Odom's most "consistent season".

During the offseason, Odom considered taking a break from basketball after a close cousin of his was murdered and he himself was a passenger in a SUV involved in an accident that tragically killed a teenage cyclist. The car accident had occurred the day after Odom attended his cousin's funeral.

Dallas Mavericks (2011–2012)
On December 11, 2011, Odom was traded to the Dallas Mavericks, the defending NBA champions, for a first-round draft pick and an $8.9 million trade exception after NBA Commissioner David Stern vetoed a proposed three-team trade that would have sent Odom and Houston Rockets teammates Kevin Martin, Luis Scola, and Goran Dragić to the New Orleans Hornets; Chris Paul to the Lakers; and Pau Gasol to the Houston Rockets. Odom felt "disrespected" after he learned of the Hornets trade publicly, and he requested a trade from the Lakers to another contending team. The Lakers were also concerned that Odom's contract was pricey since he was not needed to initiate the triangle offense with Mike Brown replacing Phil Jackson as Lakers coach.

In January 2012, Sports Illustrated reported that "Odom [had] yet to find his niche in Dallas. His struggles [made] him a frequent target of [Mavericks coach Rick] Carlisle, who [harped] on Odom's need to understand the coverages, be more alert, communicate and get in better shape ... Team sources say Odom ... appeared stressed by what they believe [was] the mental burden of an overwhelming offseason." On March 2, 2012, Odom was assigned to the Texas Legends of the NBA D-League. He had missed the prior three games due to personal reasons. His stint with the Legends was canceled on March 3, 2012, and he returned to the Mavs' active roster. On March 24, Odom did not play in a 104–87 loss to the San Antonio Spurs; this was the first time he could remember not playing due to a coach's decision.

On April 9, 2012, it was announced that Odom had parted ways with the Mavericks. Instead of releasing him, the team listed Odom as inactive for the remainder of the season. The move allowed the Mavericks to trade him at the end of the season. In a statement to ESPN, Odom said, "I'm sorry that things didn't work out better for both of us, but I wish the Mavs' organization, my teammates and Dallas fans nothing but continued success in the defense of their championship." Mavericks owner Mark Cuban admitted that a clash between the two during halftime in a game against the Memphis Grizzlies on April 7 was the last straw. Odom reportedly responded angrily when Cuban questioned his commitment, asking if he was "in or out". Odom averaged only 6.6 points in 20.5 minutes along with career lows in shooting percentage (35.2), rebounds (4.2) and assists (1.7).

Return to the Clippers (2012–2013)
On June 29, 2012, Odom was traded back to the Los Angeles Clippers as part of a four-team deal. The deal sent Odom to the Clippers, the rights to Tadija Dragićević and cash considerations to the Dallas Mavericks, Mo Williams and the draft rights to Shan Foster to the Utah Jazz, and the draft rights to Furkan Aldemir to the Houston Rockets. He played all 82 games of the season for the third time in his career, but only started two of them. Out of shape for half the season, he averaged career lows of 4.0 ppg and 1.7 apg in 19.7 mpg during the season. He also averaged 5.9 rebounds, but shot just 39.9 percent. The Clippers finished 56–26 and won their first-ever Pacific Division title.

In July 2013, Odom became a free agent, but did not land an NBA contract despite some interest from the Clippers in his return. The Lakers also contemplated re-signing him, but both teams committed to other players instead.

Laboral Kutxa Baskonia (2014)
On February 18, 2014, Odom signed with Laboral Kutxa Baskonia of the Spanish League and the Euroleague on a two-month deal with an option to extend it for the remainder of the season. A month later, he returned to the United States due to a back injury after his personal doctors in New York ruled him unfit to play out his contract. He appeared in just two games for Baskonia.

Mighty Sports (2018–2019) 
On April 16, 2014, Odom signed with the New York Knicks for the remainder of the 2013–14 season, but did not appear in the team's season finale. The Knicks finished with a 37–45 win–loss record and missed the playoffs. On July 11, 2014, he was waived by the Knicks.

Odom planned to enter the Chinese Basketball Association (CBA) in early 2018, but concluded that he was not fit enough. In December 2018, he joined Philippine club Mighty Sports, which was set to play in the 30th Dubai International Basketball Tournament on February 1–9, 2019. The roster included fellow imports Justin Brownlee and Randolph Morris, together with local amateur, former professional and Fil-Am basketball players.

Odom considered his Dubai stint to be preparation for his re-entry to professional basketball, particularly in the Big3, a US-based 3x3 basketball league founded by rapper Ice Cube. He was named a co-captain of the Enemies squad, but struggled in his first game before he was deactivated for the 2019 season by the Big3.

National team career

Odom played for the U.S. national team on the 2004 Olympic team in Athens, averaging 9.3 ppg while helping the U.S. to a bronze medal. He was invited to play for the FIBA World Championships for 2006 but declined the invitation because of the death of his son and in 2007 because of a shoulder injury.

Odom joined the 2010 FIBA World Championship team in Istanbul, Turkey, where the U.S. won win gold for the first time since 1994. Odom, being one of the elder statesmen on a young U.S. squad, served as a mentor for many of the younger players and even played out of position at center for the tournament. He led the U.S. in rebounds and finished the FIBA championships with double-doubles in the semi-final and championship games while becoming the first player in history to win both an NBA championship and FIBA gold in the same year.

Player profile
Odom was renowned for the impact his positive personality had on his teams. Lakers general manager Mitch Kupchak called him "the most popular player in our locker room". Odom valued the concept of a team and played unselfishly, and was content deferring to teammates while playing a supporting role. He was able to score as a post player, on mid-range jumpers, as well as from outside. He could start a fast break with an outlet pass, finish it with a layup, or simply drive from coast to coast for a dunk. Though he was a reserve on the Lakers championship teams, he typically finished games in place of starter Andrew Bynum.

Odom was cooperative with the media, and provided both thoughtful and open responses.

Career statistics

NBA

Regular season

|-
| style="text-align:left;"| 
| style="text-align:left;"| L.A. Clippers
| 76 || 70 || 36.4 || .438 || .360 || .719 || 7.8 || 4.2 || 1.2 || 1.3 || 16.6
|-
| style="text-align:left;"| 
| style="text-align:left;"| L.A. Clippers
| 76 || 74 || 37.3 || .460 || .316 || .679 || 7.8 || 5.2 || 1.0 || 1.6 || 17.2
|-
| style="text-align:left;"| 
| style="text-align:left;"| L.A. Clippers
| 29 || 25 || 34.4 || .419 || .190 || .656 || 6.1 || 5.9 || .8 || 1.2 || 13.1
|-
| style="text-align:left;"| 
| style="text-align:left;"| L.A. Clippers
| 49 || 47 || 34.3 || .439 || .326 || .777 || 6.7 || 3.6 || .9 || .8 || 14.6
|-
| style="text-align:left;"| 
| style="text-align:left;"| Miami
| 80 || 80 || 37.5 || .430 || .298 || .742 || 9.7 || 4.1 || 1.1 || .9 || 17.1
|-
| style="text-align:left;"| 
| style="text-align:left;"| L.A. Lakers
| 64 || 64 || 36.3 || .473 || .308 || .695 || 10.2 || 3.7 || .7 || 1.0 || 15.2
|-
| style="text-align:left;"| 
| style="text-align:left;"| L.A. Lakers
| 80 || 80 || 40.3 || .481 || .372 || .690 || 9.2 || 5.5 || .9 || .8 || 14.8
|-
| style="text-align:left;"| 
| style="text-align:left;"| L.A. Lakers
| 56 || 56 || 39.3 || .468 || .297 || .700 || 9.8 || 4.8 || .9 || .6 || 15.9
|-
| style="text-align:left;"| 
| style="text-align:left;"| L.A. Lakers
| 77 || 77 || 37.9 || .525 || .274 || .698 || 10.6 || 3.5 || 1.0 || .9 || 14.2
|-
|  style="text-align:left; background:#afe6ba;"| †
| style="text-align:left;"| L.A. Lakers
| 78 || 32 || 29.7 || .492 || .320 || .623 || 8.2 || 2.6 || 1.0 || 1.3 || 11.3
|-
|  style="text-align:left; background:#afe6ba;"| †
| style="text-align:left;"| L.A. Lakers
| 82 || 38 || 31.5 || .463 || .319 || .693 || 9.8 || 3.3 || .9 || .7 || 10.8
|-
| style="text-align:left;"| 
| style="text-align:left;"| L.A. Lakers
| 82 || 35 || 32.2 || .530 || .382 || .675 || 8.7 || 3.0 || .6 || .7 || 14.4
|-
| style="text-align:left;"| 
| style="text-align:left;"| Dallas
| 50 || 4 || 20.5 || .352 || .252 || .592 || 4.2 || 1.7 || .4 || .4 || 6.6
|-
| style="text-align:left;"| 
| style="text-align:left;"| L.A. Clippers
| 82 || 2 || 19.7 || .399 || .200 || .476 || 5.9 || 1.7 || .8 || .7 || 4.0
|- class="sortbottom"
| style="text-align:center;" colspan="2" | Career
| 961 || 684 || 33.4 || .463 || .312 || .693 || 8.4 || 3.7 || .9 || .9 || 13.3

Playoffs

|-
| style="text-align:left;"| 2004
| style="text-align:left;"| Miami
| 13 || 13 || 39.4 || .445 || .308 || .681 || 8.3 || 2.8 || 1.2 || .8 || 16.8
|-
| style="text-align:left;"| 2006
| style="text-align:left;"| L.A. Lakers
| 7 || 7 || 44.9 || .495 || .200 || .667 || 11.0 || 4.9 || .4 || 1.1 || 19.1
|-
| style="text-align:left;"| 2007
| style="text-align:left;"| L.A. Lakers
| 5 || 5 || 38.4 || .482 || .273 || .500 || 13.0 || 2.2 || .4 || 1.2 || 19.4
|-
| style="text-align:left;"| 2008
| style="text-align:left;"| L.A. Lakers
| 21 || 21 || 37.4 || .491 || .273 || .661 || 10.0 || 3.0 || .7 || 1.3 || 14.3
|-
|  style="text-align:left; background:#afe6ba;"| 2009†
| style="text-align:left;"| L.A. Lakers
| 23 || 5 || 32.0 || .524 || .514 || .613 || 9.1 || 1.8 || .7 || 1.3 || 12.3
|-
|  style="text-align:left; background:#afe6ba;"| 2010†
| style="text-align:left;"| L.A. Lakers
| 23 || 0 || 29.0 || .469 || .244 || .600 || 8.6 || 2.0 || .7 || .9 || 9.7
|-
| style="text-align:left;"| 2011
| style="text-align:left;"| L.A. Lakers
| 10 || 1 || 28.6 || .459 || .200 || .711 || 6.5 || 2.1 || .2 || .4 || 12.1
|-
| style="text-align:left;"| 2013
| style="text-align:left;"| L.A. Clippers
| 6 || 1 || 17.8 || .367 || .357 || .500 || 3.8 || 1.8 || .8 || .8 || 5.0
|- class="sortbottom"
| style="text-align:center;" colspan="2" | Career
| 108 || 53 || 33.3 || .479 || .303 || .643 || 8.8 || 2.4 || .7 || 1.0 || 13.0

International leagues

Regular season

|-
| style="text-align:left;"| 2013–14
| style="text-align:left;"| Baskonia
| 2 || 0 || 11.5 || .125 || .000 || .000 || 2.0 || .5 || 1.0 || 1.0 || 1.0
|- class="sortbottom"
| style="text-align:center;" colspan="2" | Career
| 2 || 0 || 11.5 || .125 || .000 || .000 || 2.0 || .5 || 1.0 || 1.0 || 1.0

Personal life
Odom had three children, Destiny (b. 1998), Lamar Jr. (b. 2002) and Jayden (2005–2006) with former girlfriend Liza Morales. On June 29, 2006, 6½-month-old Jayden died from sudden infant death syndrome while sleeping in his crib in New York. At the time, Odom was already in town for the funeral of an aunt. Odom developed a relationship with his father, who became drug-free; however, he remains closer to his high school coach, Jerry DeGregorio, who he calls [his] "white dad". DeGregorio is the godfather to Destiny and Lamar Jr.

In September 2009, Odom married Khloé Kardashian after a month of dating. He had met her at a party for Lakers teammate Artest. Their wedding was featured on the E! reality-based series Keeping Up with the Kardashians, in which she stars. Odom became a fixture on the show and a household name to millions who were not already familiar with him as a basketball player. In December 2010, E! announced another spinoff from the series featuring Odom, Kardashian, and his two children from his previous relationship. The series, titled Khloé & Lamar, debuted on April 10, 2011. Soon thereafter, Odom almost opted out of the show as the filming wore him down. The series was canceled in 2012 after two seasons.

On August 30, 2013, Odom was arrested on charges of driving under the influence (DUI). After the arrest, he refused to submit to a chemical test. Almost a week earlier, gossip websites had alleged that Odom had been abusing drugs, which prompted worried tweets from former teammates and coaches. On December 9, Odom pleaded no contest to the DUI charges and accepted a sentence of three years' probation and three months of alcohol abuse treatment. On December 13, after months of speculated separation, Kardashian filed for divorce from Odom and for legal restoration of her last name. Divorce papers were signed by both parties in July 2015; however, the divorce did not receive final approval from a judge before being dismissed by request in October 2015.

On October 13, 2015, Odom was hospitalized after being discovered unconscious at the Love Ranch, a legal brothel in Crystal, Nevada. Odom visited the ranch seeking the company of Cherry Ryder and Madison Montag. Odom, who had used cocaine in the days prior to his medical emergency, suffered kidney failure, several heart attacks, and 12 strokes. He became comatose and was placed on life support in a hospital in Las Vegas before regaining consciousness. He was transferred from Las Vegas to a Los Angeles hospital by medical transport. In the aftermath of the incident, Kardashian withdrew her request for a divorce; she stated that she had not reconciled with Odom, but wished to assist him in making medical decisions during his recovery.

Odom's recovery went well. On January 8, 2016, Odom's paternal aunt JaNean Mercer told Us Weekly that "the former NBA star is on the road to recovery after finally leaving the hospital earlier in the week." She said, "Lamar continues to make remarkable strides." In early 2016, Khloé Kardashian said, "I'm just there to support and care for him. But he is doing amazing." On May 26, 2016, Kardashian filed for divorce again, and their divorce was finalized in December 2016. In 2017, Odom spoke publicly about his health struggles, his cocaine addiction, and his recovery from that addiction. He called himself a "walking miracle" who had "cheated death", and acknowledged that his past drug use had made "the end of [his basketball] career come along a little faster".

Odom has his own music and film production company, Rich Soil Entertainment. He appeared in a Taco Bell commercial with Charles Barkley during Super Bowl XLIV. Additionally, Odom made a cameo on the second season of the HBO television series Entourage.

Odom is noted for his fondness for candy. Wrigley made a replica of the Larry O'Brien Championship Trophy out of candy in celebration of the Lakers' victory in the 2009 Finals, and Odom's name is featured on the base.

In 2015, Odom was #1 on the Google Trends list for living people, which measures the highest spikes in search traffic over a sustained period compared to the previous year.

In November 2019, Odom announced his engagement to Sabrina Parr, a health and lifestyle coach. On November 5, 2020, Parr confirmed that their engagement had been called off.

In February 2022, Odom was a HouseGuest on the third season of Celebrity Big Brother.

Boxing

On June 11, 2021, Odom participated in an exhibition boxing match with singer/rapper Aaron Carter. He knocked Carter out in the second round. On October 2, 2021, Odom defeated Jennifer Lopez's ex-husband Ojani Noa in a celebrity boxing match.

Filmography

See also

References

External links

Lamar Odom at acb.com
Lamar Odom at euroleague.net

1979 births
Living people
2010 FIBA World Championship players
African-American basketball players
American expatriate basketball people in Spain
American men's basketball players
Television personalities from New York City
Basketball players at the 2004 Summer Olympics
Basketball players from New York City
Big3 players
Dallas Mavericks players
FIBA World Championship-winning players
Kardashian family
Liga ACB players
Los Angeles Clippers draft picks
Los Angeles Clippers players
Los Angeles Lakers players
McDonald's High School All-Americans
Medalists at the 2004 Summer Olympics
Miami Heat players
Olympic bronze medalists for the United States in basketball
Parade High School All-Americans (boys' basketball)
Power forwards (basketball)
Rhode Island Rams men's basketball players
Saski Baskonia players
Small forwards
Sportspeople from Queens, New York
United States men's national basketball team players
American men's 3x3 basketball players
Participants in American reality television series